The 1996–97 Utah Utes men's basketball team represented the University of Utah as a member of the Western Athletic Conference during the 1996–97 men's basketball season. Led by head coach Rick Majerus, the Utes made a run through the NCAA tournament to the West regional final. The team finished with an overall record of 29–4 (15–1 WAC).

Roster

Schedule and results

|-
!colspan=9 style=| Regular season
|-

|-
!colspan=9 style=| WAC Tournament

|-
!colspan=9 style=| NCAA Tournament

Rankings

Awards and honors
Keith Van Horn – Consensus First-team All-American, WAC Player of the Year (3x)
Rick Majerus – WAC Coach of the Year

Team players in the 1997 NBA draft

References

Utah Utes men's basketball seasons
Utah
Utah
Utah Utes
Utah Utes